Hypatima antiastis is a moth in the family Gelechiidae. It was described by Edward Meyrick in 1929. It is found in India, where it has been recorded from the Andaman Islands.

References

Hypatima
Taxa named by Edward Meyrick
Moths described in 1929